Emperor swallowtail is the common name of two species of butterflies in the genus Papilio:

Papilio hesperus, endemic to tropical Africa
Papilio ophidicephalus, endemic to tropical Africa, parts of the East African coast, and the Cape region

Animal common name disambiguation pages